Rein Veidemann (born 17 October 1946, in Pärnu) is an Estonian literary scholar and politician. He was a member of VII Riigikogu.

References

Living people
1946 births
Estonian literary scholars
Members of the Riigikogu, 1992–1995
Estonian editors
Estonian magazine editors
Estonian literary critics